This article lists the results for the sport of Squash in 2011.

2011 PSA World Tour
2011 PSA World Series
 Tournament of Champions (January 21–27):  Ramy Ashour defeated  Nick Matthew 11-3, 7-11, 11-9, 11-7.
 North American Open (February 20–26):  Nick Matthew defeated  Ramy Ashour 11-9, 11-5, 8-11, 8-11, 11-6.
 Australian Open (August 8–14):  Ramy Ashour defeated  Nick Matthew 12-14, 11-6, 10-12, 11-8, 11-4.
 British Grand Prix (September 19–25):  Ramy Ashour defeated  Nick Matthew 3-11, 11-3, 11-7, 11-4.
 US Open (September 30–October 6):  Amr Shabana defeated  Nick Matthew 11-9, 8-11, 11-2, 11-4.
 Qatar Classic (October 16–21):  Grégory Gaultier defeated  James Willstrop 11-8, 11-7, 2-11, 11-8.
 Hong Kong Open (November 15–20):  James Willstrop defeated  Karim Darwish 11-5, 11-9, 11-4.
 Kuwait PSA Cup (November 23–29):  James Willstrop defeated  Karim Darwish 11-9, 10-12, 11-4, 11-2.
 PSA Masters (December 12–18):  James Willstrop defeated  Grégory Gaultier 19-21, 11-8, 11-4, 6-1.
PSA World Series Finals at London, England. January 4–8, 2012
 Amr Shabana defeated  Grégory Gaultier 6-11, 12-10, 11-7, 7-11, 11-8.
PSA World Championship at Rotterdam, Netherlands. November 1–6, 2011
 Nick Matthew defeated  Grégory Gaultier 6-11, 11-9, 11-6, 11-5.

2011 WSA World Tour
2011 WSA World Series
 Cayman Islands Open (April 4–9):  Nicol David defeated  Jenny Duncalf 11-7, 11-6, 12-14, 11-4.
 Malaysian Open (July 19–23):  Nicol David defeated  Jenny Duncalf 11-6, 12-10, 11-5.
 Australian Open (August 8–14):  Nicol David defeated  Jenny Duncalf 11-8, 11-4, 11-6.
 US Open (October 1–6):  Laura Massaro defeated  Kasey Brown 5-11, 11-5, 11-3, 11-5.
 Qatar Classic (October 16–21):  Nicol David defeated  Madeline Perry 11-2, 11-7, 11-3.
 Hong Kong Open (December 4–8):  Nicol David defeated  Raneem El Weleily 11-5, 11-4, 11-9.
WSA World Series Finals at London, England. January 4–8, 2012
 Nicol David defeated  Madeline Perry 11-9, 11-9, 11-9.
2011 Women's World Open Squash Championship at Rotterdam, Netherlands. November 1–6, 2011
  Nicol David defeated  Jenny Duncalf 11-2, 11-5, 11-0.

WSF World Team Squash Championships
 Men's World Team Championships 
   Egypt,   England,   Australia

External links
 World Squash: official website of the World Squash Federation

 
Squash by year